Turbo laminiferus, common name the crinkly turban, is a species of sea snail, marine gastropod mollusk in the family Turbinidae.

Some authors place the name in the subgenus Turbo (Marmarostoma)

Description
The length of the shell varies between 20 mm and 50 mm.
The solid, umbilicate shell has a pointed-ovate shape. Its color pattern is greenish, longitudinally flammulated with black. The conic spire is pointed. The six whorls are very convex, separated by canaliculate sutures. The body whorl has about nine rather separated lirae, the whole surface covered with crowded elevated sibfoliaceus radiating lamellae. The round aperture measures half the length of the shell or less. The peristome is usually nearly free from body whorl above. The columella is excavated at the deep and prominent umbilicus.

The operculum has a subcentral nucleus. Its outer surface is green, granulate, wrinkled on its outer margin, with a radial sulcus marking the limit of the margin of increment.

Distribution
This marine species occurs from Western Australia to Queensland, Australia; and off Papua New Guinea

References

 Iredale, T., 1914. Report on Mollusca collected at the Monte Bello Islands. Proc. Zool. Soc. Lond., 1914:665-675
 Cernohorsky, W.O., 1978. Tropical Pacific marine shells. Pacific Publications, Sydney. 1–352, 68 pls
 Wilson, B., 1993. Australian Marine Shells. Prosobranch Gastropods.. Odyssey Publishing, Kallaroo, WA
 Alf A. & Kreipl K. (2003). A Conchological Iconography: The Family Turbinidae, Subfamily Turbininae, Genus Turbo. Conchbooks, Hackenheim Germany.
 Williams, S.T. (2007). Origins and diversification of Indo-West Pacific marine fauna: evolutionary history and biogeography of turban shells (Gastropoda, Turbinidae). Biological Journal of the Linnean Society, 2007, 92, 573–592

External links
 Gastropods.com: Turbo (Marmarostoma) squamosus

laminiferus
Gastropods described in 1848